Santa Marta crater is a newly confirmed impact crater in Piauí State, northeastern Brazil.

Description 
Its impact origin was first proposed by S. Master and J. Heymann in 2000 based primarily on satellite remote sensing data and was confirmed more than a decade later after conclusive evidence of shock metamorphism such as breccia and shatter cones were found.

See also 

 Umm al Binni lake

References 

Impact craters of Brazil
Cretaceous impact craters
Cretaceous Brazil
Landforms of Piauí
Geology of Brazil